Rygel may refer to:

 Daniel Rygel the son of Zdeněk Rygel
 Dominar Rygel XVI a character from Farscape